Aphalonia is a genus of moths belonging to family Tortricidae.

Species
Aphalonia monstrata Razowski, 1984
Aphalonia praeposita (Meyrick, 1917)

See also
List of Tortricidae genera

References

 , 2005: World Catalogue of Insects vol. 5 Tortricidae.
 , 1984, Ann. Zool. 38: 276
 , 2011: Diagnoses and remarks on genera of Tortricidae, 2: Cochylini (Lepidoptera: Tortricidae). SHILAP Revista de Lepidopterología 39 (156): 397–414.

External links
Tortricid.net

Cochylini
Tortricidae genera